Charles Johnson Noyes (August 7, 1841 – October 16, 1910) was a lawyer and politician who served as the Speaker of the Massachusetts House of Representatives from 1880–1882 and 1887–1888.

Noyes was born in Haverhill, Massachusetts on August 7, 1841.

In 1864 Noyes graduated from Union College in Schenectady, New York.

In 1865 Noyes was elected to the Massachusetts House of Representatives for the 1866 session. In 1866 Noyes was elected to the Massachusetts Senate from the Third Essex District. 
In 1876 Noyes was elected to the Massachusetts House of Representatives from the Fourteenth Suffolk District for the 1877 session.

Noyes moved to Los Angeles, California on December 20, 1905.
Noyes was admitted to the bar of the California Court of Appeals on October 8. 1906.

Death and burial
Noyes died on October 16, 1910 at Sisters Hospital in Los Angeles, California from injuries he sustained in an accident.  Noyes was buried in Rosedale Cemetery in Los Angeles, California.

See also
 1867 Massachusetts legislature
 1877 Massachusetts legislature
 1880 Massachusetts legislature
 1881 Massachusetts legislature
 1888 Massachusetts legislature

Notes

1841 births
1910 deaths
Speakers of the Massachusetts House of Representatives
Massachusetts state senators
Massachusetts lawyers
Republican Party members of the Massachusetts House of Representatives
California Republicans
California lawyers
Union College (New York) alumni
19th-century American politicians
19th-century American lawyers